Nyambura Jane Njoroge is a Kenyan ecumenical leader and ordained Presbyterian minister. She was the first Kenyan woman to be ordained in the Presbyterian  Church of East Africa.

Biography
Nyambura Njoroge was born on 4th December 1956 to Mary Muthoni wa Waruguru na Gacomba, and Rev. Daniel Githanji wa Gitogo. The mother was a midwife in their Nginda, Murang'a locality, who was a leader in the PCEA's Woman's Guild and local community. In a family of 9 daughters, she is the last born. In 1978, she enrolled in Saint Paul's United Theological College, the first African woman to undertake a Bachelor of Divinity degree. She graduated in 1980. She was ordained as a minister of word and sacrament in the Presbyterian Church of East Africa on the 5th of September 1982. She was the first woman to be ordained in the denomination.

She attended the Louisville Presbyterian School in Kentucky, and in 1992, became the first African woman to earn a PhD from Princeton Theological Seminary.  Her dissertation was entitled "African Theology and Christian Social Ethics." 

Njoroge is the program executive for the World Council of Churches' program on Ecumenical HIV and AIDS Initiatives and Advocacy.  She has been working with the WCC's Ecumenical HIV and AIDS Initiative for Africa (EHAIA) since 2002. where she has also has been the EHAIA coordinator for the World Council of Churches (WCC) since 2007. During the interfaith pre-conference on HIV on the night of the 19th International AIDS Conference on July 21, with attendees singing and committing to do their bit to "turn the tide" against HIV and AIDS. Nyambura emphatically said the epidemic is more than a medical issue. “It is one where we are confronted by broken social relationships.” She was ordained by the Presbyterian Church of East Africa in Kenya. 

She co-edited Talitha Cum! Theologies of African Women, with Musa Dube. She is a founding member of the Circle of Concerned African Women Theologians and a member of the Kenyan chapter.  She is also a member of ANERELA+ (African Network of Religious Leaders living with or personally affected by HIV and AIDS.

Works 
 Ecumenism and Theological Education in Africa (2004)
 Beyond Suffering and Lament: Theology of Hope and Life (2008)
 Daughters of Africa Heed the Call for Justice, Peace, and Fullness of Life (2013)
 A New Way of Facilitating Leadership: Lessons from African Women Theologians (2005)
 Transforming Ministerial Ecumenical Formation (2009)
 An Ecumenical Commitment (2009)
 Revising Theological Education and Ministerial Formation 
 Theological Education and Doing Theology Lessons from the Past
 Kiama Kia Ngo: African Christian Feminist Ethic , Legon: Legon Theological Study Series
 Searching for Ways of Promoting Christian Unity in Theological Education and Ministerial Formation
 Theologizing during Labour Pains: Women, Children and War in the Bible
 A Spirituality of Resistance and Transformation
 Partnership in God’s Mission in Africa Today.” In Partnership in God’s Mission in Africa Today: The Papers and Reports of the Consultation of African Women and Men of Reformed Tradition 9-15
 Ecumenical Theological Education and the Church in Africa Today
 Groaning and Languishing in Labour Pains
 The Missing Voice: African Women Doing Theology
 The Promise and Ministry of the Holy Spirit: Empowering Africans to Search for the Fullness of Life
 Not an Option: Ministry with and for People with Disabilities
 Turn to God - Rejoice in Hope
 Come Now, Let Us Reason Together
 Talitha Cum! to the New Millennium: A Conclusion
 Reclaiming Our Heritage of Power: Discovering Our Theological Voices

References 

Kenyan Presbyterians
Living people
Year of birth missing (living people)